Tutill is a surname. Notable people with the surname include:

 Doris Tutill (1916–2010), New Zealand artist and Anglican priest
 Steve Tutill (born 1969), English professional footballer

See also
 Murder of Roy Tutill
 Tuttle (surname)